Louis Casimir Finet (born 5 March 1894, date of death unknown) was a Belgian vaulter who competed in the 1920 Summer Olympics. In 1920 he won the gold medal in the team vaulting competition and the bronze medal in the individual vaulting event.

References

External links
profile

1894 births
Year of death missing
Belgian male equestrians
Olympic equestrians of Belgium
Equestrians at the 1920 Summer Olympics
Olympic gold medalists for Belgium
Olympic bronze medalists for Belgium
Olympic medalists in equestrian
Medalists at the 1920 Summer Olympics
20th-century Belgian people